Huw Ceredig Jones (22 June 1942 – 16 August 2011) was a Welsh actor, best known for portraying Reg Harries in the Welsh-language soap opera Pobol y Cwm.

Early life
Huw Ceredig was born in Brynamman, Carmarthenshire, in 1942, the son of Reverend Gerallt Jones, and Elizabeth J. Griffiths, a Welsh teacher. Ceredig was educated at Llandovery College, where one of his teachers was the Welsh rugby player and coach Carwyn James, before going on to train as a teacher at Trinity College in Carmarthen. He was a member of the renowned Cilie family of poets, and was raised in Llanuwchllyn. Ceredig was the brother of Welsh politician Alun Ffred Jones, folk singer/politician Dafydd Iwan, and Arthur Morus.

Ceredig re-mortgaged his house to purchase instruments for the new Welsh band Edward H. Dafis and introduced them to the stage for the first time at the Welsh National Eisteddfod in Ruthin in 1973.

He played the part of Reg Harris on S4C's long-running soap opera, Pobol y Cwm, for 29 years, from 1974 to 2003. He also played the father of Rhys Ifans and Llŷr Ifans, "Fatty Lewis", in the film Twin Town. He also provided Welsh-language voices for Superted, and more recently, Meees.

Career
In Huw's early days, he won a scholarship to Llandovery College, where one of his teachers was the Welsh rugby player and coach Carwyn James, before going on to train as a teacher at the Trinity University College. There his interest in drama was fuelled by the celebrated Welsh drama lecturer Norah Isaac, and while teaching in two schools at Maesteg, near Bridgend, he began acting as an amateur in his spare time, using the stage name Huw Ceredig.

After being spotted in productions at the Swansea Welsh language theatre, Ceredig was offered small parts on Welsh television. He was teaching at his local primary school in Laleston, near Bridgend, when, in his early 30s, he decided to become a professional actor.
He joined the cast of Pobol y Cwm at the outset, and remained a popular fixture in the show for almost 30 years. When he was written out in 2003 – Reg Harries met with a car accident – Ceredig was aggrieved that he had not been allowed to stay for another year to complete three full decades in the part.

Between 1987 and 1994 his on-screen son, Gareth Wyn Harries, was played by the young actor Ioan Gruffudd, who later became a film star, with credits including Titanic (1997), Black Hawk Down (2001), Fantastic Four (2005) and Rise of the Silver Surfer (2007).
Ceredig’s own film credits include the 1992 comedy Rebecca’s Daughters and the Dylan Thomas biopic The Edge of Love (2008). He also featured as Fatty Lewis in the cult comedy film Twin Town (1997), which launched the career of Rhys Ifans, and was also seen in other television roles in Emmerdale, Heartbeat and Z-Cars.

His voice was familiar to generations of younger viewers through his voiceover work on Welsh television series, notably the animation SuperTed and more recently Meees, about a family of multicultural operatic sheep ("meees" being the Welsh for "baaas", the noise that sheep make).

Ceredig, who became a household name in Wales, was a gregarious man with a remarkable gift for forging firm friendships. A fan of sport in general, his overriding passion was for rugby, and for a time he served as chairman of Bridgend Rugby Club. He was also a devotee of the Turf, and at one period was the part-owner of a racehorse.

Personal life
Ceredig was married to Margaret, and they had two daughters. He died, following a long term illness, at Morriston Hospital in Cwmrhydyceirw, Swansea, on 16 August 2011 at the age of 69. Ioan Gruffudd, who played his son on Pobol y Cwm for ten years was one of those who paid tribute.

Filmography
FilmThe Mouse and the Woman (1980) - SergeantGiro City (1982) - Elwyn DaviesRebecca's Daughters (1992, cyfres) - Mordecai ThomasTwin Town (1997) - Fatty LewisThe Edge of Love (2008) - John Patrick (final film role)

TelevisionZ-Cars (1977, cyfres) - Det. Con. ProbertPobol y Cwm (1980-2000, opera sebon) - Reg HarriesThe Life and Times of David Lloyd George (1981, cyfres) - D.A. ThomasEnnal's Point (1982, cyfres) - Len DunceThe District Nurse (1984, cyfres) - RowlandsI Fro Breuddwydion (1987, ffilm teledu) - FfermwrWe Are Seven (1989–1991) - Jim PowellRebecca's Töchter (1992) - Mordecai ThomasYr Heliwr (1997, cyfres) - Peter WebbEmmerdale (2003, opera sebon) - George GibbonsHeartbeat (2005, cyfres) - Cyril WilliamsDoctors (2005, cyfres) - Kenneth GoughY Pris (2007, cyfres) - Rhidian EdwardsHawkmoorEnoc Huws''

Voice
SuperTed
Meees

Bibliography

References

External links

1942 births
2011 deaths
Welsh male soap opera actors
Welsh male television actors
People from Brynamman
People educated at Llandovery College
20th-century Welsh male actors
20th-century Welsh educators